The imperial election of 1619 was an imperial election held to select the emperor of the Holy Roman Empire.  It took place in Frankfurt on August 28.

Background 
This was the sixth imperial election to take place during the Reformation.  On October 31, 1517, Martin Luther, a professor of moral theology at the University of Wittenberg, now part of the Martin Luther University of Halle-Wittenberg, had delivered the Ninety-five Theses to Albert of Brandenburg, the elector of Mainz.  This list of propositions criticized the practice of selling indulgences, remissions of the punishment meted out for sin in Purgatory.  Luther's criticism snowballed into a massive schism in the church, and from there into a split among the states of the empire.  By 1600, the elector of the Electoral Palatinate was Calvinist and the electors of Saxony and Brandenburg were Lutheran.

Bohemian Revolt 

Rudolf II, Holy Roman Emperor, Holy Roman Emperor and king of Hungary and Bohemia, was Catholic.  In 1600 he was engaged in the Long Turkish War, which had drained the resources of his kingdoms and of the empire since 1593.  On December 28, 1604, following military reverses and an economic crisis in Hungary, the Hungarian nobleman Stephen Bocskai launched a revolt.  The Bocskai uprising lasted until 1606 and put additional pressure on Rudolf's resources.  It was in this situation that Rudolf was forced to grant the Letter of Majesty in 1609, allowing the free practice of Protestant religions in Bohemia and creating a Bohemian Protestant state church run by the Protestant estates.

In 1617, Matthias, Holy Roman Emperor, by now Holy Roman Emperor and king of Hungary and Bohemia, arranged for the election of Ferdinand II, Holy Roman Emperor as his successor in Bohemia under the terms of the Oñate treaty.  The fiercely Catholic Ferdinand II had suppressed Protestantism on his lands in Styria and had repudiated the Letter of Majesty.  When, in 1618, Ferdinand II sent his representatives, Vilém Slavata of Chlum and Jaroslav Bořita of Martinice, to Prague to administer the government, they were thrown from the third floor of Prague Castle by members of the dissolved Protestant estates.

Election of 1619 
On August 26, 1619, the estates of Bohemia deposed Ferdinand II and elected Frederick V of the Palatinate, elector of the Electoral Palatinate, as king.  Frederick accepted.  Nonetheless, the other electors refused to hear an embassy of the Bohemian estates and confirmed Ferdinand II as Bohemian king and elector, with only the Palatine delegation objecting.  The remaining five electors were:

 Johann Schweikhard von Kronberg, elector of Mainz
 Lothar von Metternich, elector of Trier
 Ferdinand of Bavaria, elector of Cologne
 John George I, Elector of Saxony, elector of Saxony
 John Sigismund, Elector of Brandenburg, elector of Brandenburg

Elected 
Frederick, after casting a vote for Maximilian I, Elector of Bavaria, duke of Bavaria, retracted his vote and joined the other six electors in voting for Ferdinand II, who was crowned in Frankfurt on September 9.

1619
1619 in the Holy Roman Empire
Non-partisan elections
Ferdinand II, Holy Roman Emperor
17th-century elections in Europe